This list 2020 in paleomalacology is a list of new taxa of ammonites and other fossil cephalopods, as well as fossil gastropods, bivalves and other molluscs that are scheduled to be described during the year 2020, as well as other significant discoveries and events related to molluscan paleontology that are scheduled to occur in the year 2020.

Ammonites

New taxa

General research
 A study aiming to determine the drag force experienced by a wide range of ammonite shell shapes is published by Hebdon, Ritterbush & Choi (2020).
 A study evaluating how different parameters affected the ammonite shell's response to water pressure, aiming to determine whether the ammonite septa strengthened the shell against pressure at increasing water depths, is published by Lemanis (2020).
 A study on global patterns of ammonite diversification and extinction from the Early Devonian (Emsian) to the Early Triassic (Induan) is published by Whalen, Hull & Briggs (2020).
 A study on the abundance and size distribution of small specimens of Baculites and Hoploscaphites at eight cold methane seep sites in the Upper Cretaceous Pierre Shale (South Dakota, United States) is published by Rowe et al. (2020), who interpret their findings as indicating that newly hatched ammonites lived in close proximity to seep fluids emerging at the sediment-water interface and the associated microbial food web.
 A study on changes of hydrostatic properties of three species of Didymoceras during their ontogeny is published by Peterman et al. (2020).

Other cephalopods

New taxa

General research
 A study aiming to determine whether the development of chamber volume in fossil cephalopod phragmocones conveys information about their physiology is published by Tajika et al. (2020), who evaluate the implications of their findings for the knowledge of the ecology and extinction selectivity of fossil cephalopods.
 A study on the spatial distribution of Givetian oncocerid fossils from the Hamar Laghdad ridge (eastern Anti-Atlas, Morocco), evaluating its implications for the knowledge of the life cycle of these cephalopods, is published by Pohle et al. (2020).
 Jurassic nautiloid Somalinautilus antiquus, previously known only from the Kimmeridgian strata of Ethiopia, is reported from the Kimmeridgian of Southern Germany by Schweigert (2020), who also reports the first finding of the species Somalinautilus clavifer the Middle Jurassic (Bathonian) of Southern Germany.
 A study on the reproductive strategies of fossil coleoids, based on data from shells of belemnoids, spirulids and sepiids, is published by Fuchs et al. (2020).
 A specimen of Plesioteuthis preserved with an associated tooth of a pterosaur is reported from the Upper Jurassic Altmühltal Formation (Germany) by Hoffmann et al. (2020), who evaluate the implications of this finding for the knowledge of the likely habitat of Plesioteuthis.

Gastropods

New taxa

Research
 A study on the evolutionary history of pteropods, based on molecular data and revised fossil evidence, is published by Peijnenburg et al. (2020).

Bivalves

New taxa

Other mollusks

New taxa

Research
 New specimens of Pelagiella exigua with associated impressions of two clusters of chaetae, providing new information on the anatomy of this taxon, are described from the Cambrian Kinzers Formation (Pennsylvania, United States) by Thomas, Runnegar & Matt (2020), who infer the occurrence of a pair of chaeta-bearing appendages extending from the anterior body wall or foot of the animal (unique among living and extinct molluscs), and interpret Pelagiella as the earliest known stem gastropod.

References

2020 in paleontology
Paleomalacology
Molluscs described in 2020